António Emílio Leite Couto, better known as Mia Couto (born 5 July 1955), is a Mozambican writer. He won the Camões Prize in 2013, the most important literary award in the Portuguese language, and the Neustadt International Prize for Literature in 2014.

Life

Early years
Mia Couto was born in the city of Beira, Mozambique's third largest city, where he was also raised and schooled. He is the son of Portuguese emigrants who moved to the Portuguese colony in the 1950s. When he was 14 years old, some of his poetry was published in a local newspaper, Notícias da Beira. Three years later, in 1971, he moved to the capital Lourenço Marques (now Maputo) and began to study medicine at the University of Lourenço Marques. During this time, the anti-colonial guerrilla and political movement FRELIMO was struggling to overthrow the Portuguese colonial rule in Mozambique.

After independence of Mozambique
In April 1974, after the Carnation Revolution in Lisbon and the overthrow of the Estado Novo regime, Mozambique was about to become an independent republic. In 1974, FRELIMO asked Couto to suspend his studies for a year to work as a journalist for Tribuna until September 1975 and then as the director of the newly created Mozambique Information Agency (AIM). Later, he ran Tempo magazine until 1981. His first book of poems, Raiz de Orvalho, was published in 1983; it included texts aimed against the dominance of Marxist militant propaganda. Couto continued working for the newspaper Notícias until 1985 when he resigned to finish his course of study in biology.

Literary works and recognition
Not only is Mia Couto considered one of the most important writers in Mozambique, but his works have been published in more than 20 countries and in various languages, including Portuguese, English, French, German, Czech, Italian, Serbian, Catalan, Estonian and Chinese. In many of his texts, he undertakes to recreate the Portuguese language by infusing it with regional vocabulary and structures from Mozambique, thus producing a new model for the African narrative. Stylistically, his writing is influenced by magical realism, a movement popular in modern Latin American literatures, and his use of language is reminiscent of the Brazilian writer João Guimarães Rosa, but also deeply influenced by the baiano writer Jorge Amado. He has been noted for creating proverbs, sometimes known as "improverbs", in his fiction, as well as riddles, legends, metaphors, giving his work a poetic dimension.

An international jury at the Zimbabwe International Book Fair named his first novel, Terra Sonâmbula (Sleepwalking Land), one of the best 12 African books of the 20th century. In 2007, he became the first African author to win the prestigious Latin Union literary prize, which has been awarded annually in Italy since 1990. Mia Couto became only the fourth writer in the Portuguese language to take home this prestigious award, having competed against authors from Portugal, France, Colombia, Spain, Italy, and Senegal. Currently, he is a biologist employed by the Great Limpopo Transfrontier Park while continuing his work on other writing projects.

In 1998, Couto was elected into the Brazilian Academy of Letters, the first African writer to receive such an honor.

Awards and honours
2014 Neustadt International Prize for Literature
2013 Camões Prize
2007 Latin Union Prize

Books
Raiz do Orvalho (poetry, 1983)
Vozes Anoitecidas (short stories, 1986). [Voices Made Night. Translated by David Brookshaw (1990) ]
Cada Homem É uma Raça (short stories, 1990) 
Cronicando (crônicas, 1991) 
Terra Sonâmbula (novel, 1992)  [Sleepwalking Land. Translated by David Brookshaw (2006) ]
Estórias Abensonhadas (short stories, 1994) 
Every man is a race [Translation of selected works from: Cada homem é uma raça, and Cronicando; translated by David Brookshaw] (1994) 
A Varanda do Frangipani (novel, 1996)  [Under the Frangipani. Translated by David Brookshaw. (2001) ]
Contos do Nascer da Terra (short stories, 1997)
Mar Me Quer (novella, 1998)
Vinte e Zinco (novella, 1999) 
Raiz de orvalho e outros poemas (1999) 
O Último Voo do Flamingo (novel, 2000)  [The Last Flight of the Flamingo. Translated by David Brookshaw. (2004) ]
Mar me quer (2000)
O Gato e o Escuro (children's book, 2001)
Na Berma de Nenhuma Estrada e Outros Contos (short stories, 2001)
Um Rio Chamado Tempo, uma Casa Chamada Terra (novel, 2002)
Contos do Nascer da Terra (short stories, 2002)
O País do Queixa Andar (crônicas, 2003)
O Fio das Missangas (short stories, 2003)
A chuva pasmada (2004) 
Pensatempos: textos de opinião (2005) 
O Outro Pé da Sereia (novel, 2006) 
Venenos de Deus, Remédios do Diabo (novel, 2008) 
Jesusalém (novel, 2009) 
A Confissão da Leoa (novel, 2012) [Confession of the Lioness. Translated by David Brookshaw (2015). ]
Pensativities: Selected Essays. Translated by David Brookshaw (2015). 
Mulheres de cinzas (the first book of the trilogy As Areias do Imperador) (2015) [Woman of the Ashes. Translated by David Brookshaw (2018). ]
 A Espada e a Azagaia (the second book of the trilogy As Areias do Imperador) (2016)
 O Bebedor de Horizontes (the third book of the trilogy As Areias do Imperador) (2018)

References

Relevant literature
 de Araújo Teixeira, Eduardo. "O provérbio nas estórias de Guimarães Rosa e Mia Couto." Navegações 8, no. 1 (2015): 57-63.
 Van Haesendonck, Kristian. "Mia Couto’s Postcolonial Epistemology: Animality in Confession of the Lioness (A Confissão da leoa)." ZOOPHILOLOGICA. Polish Journal of Animal Studies 5 (2019): 297-308.

External links

Criticism:
 "O outro pé da sereia: the dialogue between history and fiction in the representation of contemporary Africa"
 "Exílio e identidade: uma leitura de Antes de nascer o mundo, de Mia Couto"
 Website: Limpopo Transfrontier Park
 Maya Jaggi, "Mia Couto: 'I am white and African. I like to unite contradictory worlds'", The Guardian, 15 August 2015.
 Jacob Judah (March 11, 2023). How Mia Couto’s Words Help Weave the Story of Mozambique. The New York Times. 

Living people
People from Beira, Mozambique
Mozambican poets
Mozambican people of Portuguese descent
Mozambican novelists
Mozambican short story writers
Mozambican children's writers
20th-century poets
20th-century novelists
21st-century novelists
Eduardo Mondlane University alumni
Mozambican biologists
20th-century short story writers
21st-century short story writers
1955 births
Camões Prize winners
20th-century pseudonymous writers
21st-century pseudonymous writers